Carlos Manuel Bocanegra (born May 25, 1979) is an American sports executive and former professional soccer player. A two-time MLS Defender of the Year, Bocanegra also played professionally in England, Scotland, France, and Spain. He earned over 100 caps with the United States, serving as captain for six years. He is currently serving as technical director and vice president for Atlanta United.

Early life and education
Bocanegra was born in Upland, CA on May 25, 1979, to Manuel and Kelly Bocanegra. He was raised in Alta Loma, Rancho Cucamonga, California, where he attended Alta Loma High School. He has one brother, Diego, who played soccer at Grand Canyon University, UCLA and Fresno State. Diego is currently the head coach of the University of Houston women's soccer team. His father is of Mexican descent. While attending UCLA, Bocanegra studied history and geography. Prior to attending UCLA, Bocanegra was offered scholarships for American football but opted for soccer, which he thought of choosing as his career. He was inducted into the UCLA Athletics Hall of Fame in 2013.

Club career

Chicago Fire 
After playing college soccer at UCLA, Bocanegra signed a Project-40 contract with Major League Soccer and was drafted by the Chicago Fire with the fourth overall pick in the 2000 MLS SuperDraft. He spent most of the year with the Fire, playing two games on loan with Project 40. He won the MLS Rookie of the Year Award for a team that made it to the MLS Championship match and won the Lamar Hunt U.S. Open Cup. He became one of the top defenders in MLS, becoming the first player to win the MLS Defender of the Year Award twice, in 2002 and 2003. Bocanegra scored five goals and had eight assists in his four years in MLS.

Fulham 

Bocanegra was signed by Fulham in January 2004, quickly becoming a fan favorite, garnering the nicknames the Jackal and the Black Snake. With Fulham, Bocanegra played primarily as a center back, but also as a left back and briefly as a holding midfielder. During the 2006–07 Premier League season, he was Fulham's second leading scorer with five goals, behind fellow American Brian McBride. On September 1, 2007, Bocanegra captained Fulham for the first time in a Premier League match, a come from behind 3–3 draw with Tottenham Hotspur. On September 15, 2007, he made his 100th appearance in the Premier League, all for Fulham, against Wigan Athletic. He was released by Fulham on May 23, 2008.

Rennes 
Bocanegra was signed by Rennes in June 2008. He received the number 3 shirt, which is his number for the United States. Bocanegra performed well in his first season in France, appearing in all 38 league matches. He scored his first league goal on March 8, 2009, in Stade Rennais's 2–0 victory over Auxerre. He also scored a goal in a UEFA Cup match and started all the club's Coupe de France matches. These included the 2009 Coupe de France Final at the Stade de France on May 9, 2009, where he scored Stade Rennais' first goal against Guingamp, in the 69th minute.

Saint-Étienne 
On July 16, 2010, Bocanegra was purchased by fellow Ligue 1 club Saint-Étienne for a reported fee of £400,000. He wore the number three shirt, as he did captaining the U.S. during the 2010 FIFA World Cup. Bocanegra made his debut for the club, on the opening game of the season, in a 3–1 loss against PSG. On December 5, 2010, he scored his first goal for the club, in a 2–2 draw against Bordeaux; followed up his second goal in the Derby du Rhône, but couldn't help Saint-Étienne win, as they lost 4–1. Bocanegra would be often used in first-team ins and out in his first season. In a match against Nice, on October 17, 2010, Bocanegra suffered whiplash injury, that kept him out for three weeks.

In the 2011–12 season, Bocanegra took the captaincy temporarily following Loïc Perrin's absence, on the opening game of the season, as Saint-Étienne win 2–1 against Bordeaux. This turned out to be his only appearance. He was linked with a move to Rangers, but was warned by Saint-Étienne that they would not sell him.

Rangers 
On August 17, 2011, Bocanegra joined Scottish Premier League side Rangers, signing a three-year deal for an undisclosed fee.
Bocanegra made his debut for Rangers against NK Maribor on August 18, 2011, in a UEFA Europa League qualifier. His involvement in this match later caused controversy when Maribor filed a complaint to UEFA regarding the eligibility of Bocanegra's appearance, questioning whether he had the required clearance and paperwork. The protest was rejected by UEFA on August 24 as Maribor did not submit it within twenty-four hours of the match. The club's chief later described the complaint by Maribor regarding Bocanegra's eligibility as 'pathetic mischief making'. He scored his first goal for Rangers in the second leg of the Maribor tie as Rangers crashed out 3–2 on aggregate.

Bocanegra scored his first league goal for the club on September 24 against Dunfermline Athletic in a 4–0 win. His second goal came three months later, on December 17, 2011, during a 2–1 win over Inverness Caledonian Thistle. Bocanegra quickly became a fan favorite after a series of solid and impressive performances alongside his center-back partner, Dorin Goian. He was nicknamed Captain America by the Rangers fans and captained Rangers for the first time on January 8, 2012, during a 4–0 win over Arbroath in the Scottish Cup.

During the season, Rangers went into administration over financial problems and a dispute with HMRC, leading to a 10-point deduction. Bocanegra spoke about the event, describing it as a "horrible experience" and encouraging players to light up the dejected fans. He also stated his desire to stay at the club, insisting he was happy there. During an "Old Firm" 3–2 victory, on March 25, 2012, Bocanegra received a straight red card after fouling Georgios Samaras, conceding a penalty.

After Rangers FC went into administration, in June 2012 the company's assets, including the players' contracts, were purchased by Charles Green's consortium. Although many players departed because of this, Bocanegra's future was uncertain after not attending training, as he wanted to leave in order to play at a higher level. A few weeks later, on July 29, 2012, McCoist appointed Bocanegra captain for the first round of the Challenge Cup- a 2–1 win over Brechin City. After the game Bocanegra announced his intention to stay, vowing not to walk away from the club. He then made six appearances at the start of the season. After being dropped by the national team, Bocanegra joined Racing de Santander on a season-long loan in an attempt to keep his international career alive.

Racing Santander 
On August 31, 2012, Bocanegra joined Spanish Segunda División side Racing Santander on a season-long loan. Bocanegra expressed a desire to return to Rangers once his loan deal has expired.
He made his debut for the club, on September 22, 2012, in a 1–0 win over CD Mirandés. 
However, his time at Santander was considered "disastrous", as he failed to start the remainder of the matches, though still played regularly, coming on as a substitute. The club was relegated to next division.

On April 9, 2013, Carlos announced on his Twitter page that he would return to Rangers for the 2013–14 season. Though announcing his return, U.S. National Team Coach Jürgen Klinsmann warned Carlos not to play for Rangers next season.

Chivas USA 
In the summer of 2013, Bocanegra left Rangers and signed with Chivas USA. Chivas USA traded up the allocation order with Toronto FC to land his signature, sending a first-round 2015 MLS SuperDraft pick and an international slot to the Canadian club.

Bocanegra retired at the end of the 2014 MLS season.

International career

Bocanegra played for the United States at the 1999 FIFA World Youth Championship and earned his first senior cap for the U.S. on December 9, 2001, against South Korea. He became a stalwart for the team in 2003, solidifying his position during the 2003 Gold Cup and leading all defenders with thirteen appearances during that year. During World Cup qualification in 2005, his role with the national team became less clear, as he bounced between roles at center back and left back. On May 2, 2006, Bocanegra was named to the United States World Cup roster for the tournament in Germany. He started two of three games at left back during the 2006 World Cup.

Bocanegra was first-choice captain of the U.S. squad under manager Bob Bradley. Bocanegra captained the national team for the first time in a 4–1 U.S. victory in a June 2, 2007, friendly against China. Bocanegra captained the United States national team that defeated No. 1 ranked Spain to win one of the 2009 FIFA Confederations Cup semi-final games on June 24, 2009. He then continued his leadership duties throughout the 2010 FIFA World Cup, starting at left back against England and Slovenia and then as the left-center back against Algeria and Ghana.

On November 15, 2011, Bocanegra joined the 100 cap club achieving his 100th international cap in a friendly against Slovenia. In March 2013, Bocanegra was initially included on the preliminary team for the start of the final stage of World Cup qualification; however, he did not make the final team. Bocanegra's further exclusion from qualification, in part due to his unstable club situation, led to the appointment of Clint Dempsey as captain of the USMNT. Bocanegra was subsequently not a part of the team at the 2013 Gold Cup or the 2014 World Cup.

Post-playing career
Bocanegra was appointed technical director of Atlanta United in March 2015. In October 2017, he signed a new four-year contract with the club, which also added the title of vice president to his role.

He was appointed to co-chair the Technical Development Committee at U.S. Soccer in April 2018.

In September 2020, Bocanegra was elected to the National Soccer Hall of Fame.

Career statistics

Club

International

Scores and results list the United States' goal tally first, score column indicates score after each Bocanegra goal

Honors
Chicago Fire
 U.S. Open Cup: 2000, 2003

United States
 CONCACAF Gold Cup: 2002, 2007

Individual
 MLS Rookie of the Year: 2000
 MLS Defender of the Year: 2002, 2003

See also
 List of men's footballers with 100 or more international caps

References

External links

 
 
 
 
Carlos Bocanegra at UCLA Bruins

1979 births
Living people
2002 CONCACAF Gold Cup players
2003 FIFA Confederations Cup players
2003 CONCACAF Gold Cup players
2006 FIFA World Cup players
2007 CONCACAF Gold Cup players
2009 FIFA Confederations Cup players
2010 FIFA World Cup players
2011 CONCACAF Gold Cup players
CONCACAF Gold Cup-winning players
Expatriate footballers in England
Expatriate footballers in France
American soccer players
American expatriate soccer players
American expatriate sportspeople in England
Expatriate footballers in Scotland
American Youth Soccer Organization players
Chicago Fire FC players
MLS Pro-40 players
Fulham F.C. players
Ligue 1 players
Scottish Premier League players
People from Upland, California
Premier League players
Soccer players from California
Stade Rennais F.C. players
AS Saint-Étienne players
Rangers F.C. players
Racing de Santander players
Chivas USA players
UCLA Bruins men's soccer players
United States men's under-20 international soccer players
United States men's under-23 international soccer players
United States men's international soccer players
American sportspeople of Mexican descent
FIFA Century Club
A-League (1995–2004) players
Major League Soccer players
Major League Soccer All-Stars
Scottish Football League players
Segunda División players
Chicago Fire FC draft picks
American expatriate sportspeople in Scotland
American expatriate sportspeople in France
Expatriate footballers in Spain
American expatriate sportspeople in Spain
Association football defenders
National Soccer Hall of Fame members